Varvara Cove is the 3.3 km wide cove indenting for 1.9 km the southwest coast of Nelson Island in the South Shetland Islands, Antarctica.  Entered southeast of The Toe and northwest of Ross Point.

The cove is named after the settlement of Varvara in southeastern Bulgaria.

Location
British mapping in 1968.

Maps
 South Shetland Islands. Scale 1:200000 topographic map No. 3373. DOS 610 - W 62 58. Tolworth, UK, 1968.
 Antarctic Digital Database (ADD). Scale 1:250000 topographic map of Antarctica. Scientific Committee on Antarctic Research (SCAR). Since 1993, regularly upgraded and updated.

References
 Varvara Cove. SCAR Composite Gazetteer of Antarctica.
 Bulgarian Antarctic Gazetteer. Antarctic Place-names Commission. (details in Bulgarian, basic data in English)

External links
 Varvara Cove. Copernix satellite image

Coves of the South Shetland Islands
Bulgaria and the Antarctic